Florin Balaban (born 16 August 1968) is a Romanian badminton player. He competed in the men's singles tournament at the 1992 Summer Olympics.

References

1968 births
Living people
Romanian male badminton players
Olympic badminton players of Romania
Badminton players at the 1992 Summer Olympics
Place of birth missing (living people)